A Glint at the Kindling is a folk album released in 1979 by Robin Williamson and his Merry Band.

This album would be the last collaboration between Robin Williamson and his Merry Band. Largely biographical, the album's concept is based on Williamson's own poem entitled Five Denials On Merlin's Grave which in turn was inspired by five broad stages of ancient British history. Many of the tracks, including "Me and the Mad Girl" and "Lough Foyle", are still performed by Williamson today.

The 2005 CD re-release by Gott Discs includes 5 bonus poetry tracks: "Five Bardic Mysteries". These were originally released in 1985 on cassette and it showcases Williamson's skill as a storyteller.

Track listing 
"The Road The Gypsies Go" (Robin Williamson) – 
"Me and the Mad Girl" (Williamson) – 
"Lough Foyle" (Williamson) – 
"The Woodcutter's Song" (Williamson) – 
"By Weary Well" (Chris Caswell, Williamson) – 
"Boyhood of Henry Morgan/ The Pooka" (Chris Caswell, McMillan, Williamson, Sylvia Woods) – 
"Five Denials of Merlin's Grave" (Caswell, McMillan, Williamson, Woods) – 
"The Poacher's Song" (Williamson) –

Personnel 
Robin Williamson – vocals, 6 and 12 string guitars, mandolin, percussion, harp, mandocello, jaw harp, bombard, mouth organ.
Sylvia Woods – harmonium, harp, harpsichord
Jerry McMillan – fiddle, viola
Chris Caswell – bagpipes, flute, percussion, trombone, accordion, concertina, harp, recorder, spoons, mouth organ
John Gilson – drums
Michael Bach – bass guitar

References

1979 albums
Robin Williamson albums